Laodice (fl. late 3rd – early 2nd centuries BC) was a Greek Princess from the Seleucid Empire and the wife of King Mithridates III of Pontus.

Laodice appears to have come from obscure origins. Laodice could not have been a supposed daughter of the Seleucid King Antiochus IV Epiphanes., although such has been proposed in literature, because Mithradates III of Pontos died before Antiochos IV yet had children, in other words the chronology is impossible. This incorrect proposition is based on the assumption that the sister of Alexander Balas who appeared in Rome with him in 153 BC as a genuine daughter of Antiochus IV Epiphanes was the Laodice who married Mithridates III.

Rather, the 153 BC Laodice could have married Mithradates V. Antiochus IV Epiphanes had two daughters who were Laodice VI from this marriage to his sister-wife Laodice IV and his other daughter was Antiochis the child from his concubine. However this assumption shows that Antiochus IV Epiphanes may have had another daughter called Laodice, however this is not certain.

The assumption shows that there could some confusion about the identity of this Laodice and Laodice VI.  Laodice, were she a Seleukide, should be daughter of the generation of Seleukos Kallinikos, Antiokhos Hierax and Andromakhos, or of the generation of Akhaios the younger and Seleukos Keraunos.

The correct Laodice had three children with Mithridates III:  Pharnaces I of Pontus,  Mithridates IV of Pontus, and Laodice.

See also

 List of Syrian monarchs
 Timeline of Syrian history

References

Sources
M. Getzel, Hellenistic settlements in Europe, the islands and Asia Minor, Cohen University of California Press, 1995
J.D. Grainger, A Seleukid prosopography and gazetteer, BRILL 1997
https://www.livius.org/la-ld/laodice/laodice_iv.html
The First Royal Coinage of Pontos (from Mithridates III to Mithridates V), Francois de Callatay

3rd-century BC women
2nd-century BC women
3rd-century BC Greek people
2nd-century BC Greek people
People of the Seleucid Empire
Seleucid princesses
Queens of Pontus